, commonly referred to as Sakura Wars TV, is a 2000 Japanese anime created by Madhouse first broadcast on TBS and later on other TV stations. It is based on the Sakura Wars video game franchise by Sega and Red Entertainment.

The TV series was licensed by ADV Films in 2003 and was released on DVD in six volumes and a box set. In 2009, the series was licensed by Sentai Filmworks.

Overview

The characters and settings are based on the video games, but the story was significantly altered.

Episode list

Reception
Zac Bertschy of Anime News Network gave the fourth DVD a D+ for dialogue, a D for Story and animation and a B for art and music.

Theorin Martin of Anime News Network gave the complete TV series collection a C for the dub, a B− for the sub, a C+ for the story, a B for the animation and art and a B+ for the music.

THEM Anime gave the series three stars out of five.

References

External links
 
Official Madhouse website 
Official ADV website 
Official Anime Network website 

2000 anime television series debuts
2000 Japanese television series debuts
2000 Japanese television series endings
Madhouse (company)
ADV Films
Sentai Filmworks
TBS Television (Japan) original programming
Anime television series based on video games
Works based on Sakura Wars